Coastal & Marine Union (EUCC) is a nonprofit organization with a membership of around 500 institutions, NGOs and experts, in 40 countries. Its network at large involves about 2500 professionals involved in coastal and marine management issues. Founded in 1989 with the aim of promoting coastal management by bridging the gap between scientists, environmentalists, site managers, planners and policy makers, it has grown into the largest network of coastal practitioners and experts in Europe, with 13 National Branches, an International Secretariat in Leiden (the Netherlands), and offices in Barcelona (Spain), Biarritz (France), Warnemünde (Germany), Szczecin (Poland), Klaipeda (Lithuania) and Sliema (Malta). EUCC's working area is Europe and its neighbouring regions, especially the Black Sea and the Mediterranean.

EUCC's mission has evolved throughout years of activity and currently is dedicated to conserving and maintaining healthy seas and attractive coasts for both people and nature; and, that people can enjoy these environments in a socially safe and sound way as well.

To this end, regarding the coastal and marine environment, EUCC seeks to:
 Promote, foster and implement ecosystem restoration initiatives and projects
 Promote, foster and implement sustainable development initiatives and projects
 Provide training, education and awareness raising

The organisation has a number of important strategic partners and alliances including: ECNC Group, Global Sustainable Tourism Council (GSTC), BioMarine, IUCN, EECONET Action Fund, European Habitats Forum (EHF), ECOTRANS and MIO-ECSDE. Furthermore, EUCC has the observer status in the OSPAR and HELCOM regional conventions and is in the process to become Barcelona Convention/Mediterranean Action Plan (MAP) partner.

Origins and history
At the occasion of the 10th anniversary of the Dutch dune conservation foundation (Stichting Duinbehoud), the 1st European Dune Conference was organized in September 1987, which brought together ecologists, academics and managers of sand dune coasts from twelve European countries, in Leiden, the Netherlands, to discuss future directions for conservation management. As a result of this conference the European Union for Dune conservation & Coastal management (EUDC) was launched and formally founded in Leiden, the Netherlands, on 6 January 1989, as an association under the Dutch law. Its first undertaking consisted in producing an inventory of coastal dunes throughout Europe. Under the leadership of its Director General Albert Salman, the association evolved towards a broader coastal scope and then changed the name to European Union for Coastal Conservation (EUCC) in 1991 at the occasion of the 3rd International Conference in Galway (Ireland). Since then, the abbreviation has been kept. Milestones of the first period are the organisation of the 1st European Coastal Conservation Conference in Scheveningen 1991, and a contribution to the preparation of the Pan-European Biological and Landscape Diversity Strategy (PEBLDS), adopted in 1995 by the Environment for Europe Ministers Conference. Later on, under the auspices of UNEP and the Council of Europe, EUCC led the elaboration of the European Coastal & Marine Ecological Network (ECMEN)  and the European Code of Conduct for Coastal Zones. The latter was officially adopted by the Council of Europe Ministers in 1999.

When the Maastricht Treaty established the European Union under its current name in 1993, the organization started identifying problems of misinterpretations of its name and resolved to change it to EUCC – The Coastal Union in 2001. During these years the main field of work was the promotion of integrated coastal zone management in Europe, contributing to the EC Demonstration Programme on ICZM  (1996-1999). EUCC participated in the UNEP ICZM Conference of 1998 in St Petersburg  which recommended a demonstration programme to be launched on ICZM for Central and Eastern Europe and Central Asia. EUCC took the lead to organise in conjunction with UNEP's PAP/RAC, the first intergovernmental ICZM meeting (ICMCEENIS), in Croatia in June 2000, bringing together representatives from 18 non EU coastal States and from the Regional Seas Programmes for the Eastern Mediterranean, Baltic, Caspian and Black Seas who expressed support common ICZM initiatives for their regions. This role was boosted by the adoption of the European Commission Recommendation on ICZM in 2002  when EUCC entered the EU ICZM Expert Group  and the Working Group on Indicators and Data, and was assigned the elaboration of an indicator-based methodology to measure progress on ICZM implementation. A milestone of this period is the contribution to the EC DG ENV commissioned study EUROSION which resulted on recommendations on how to manage coastal erosion in Europe in a sustainable way. EUCC had a mayor role on the development of the policy recommendations  and the publication of the study results.

Acknowledging the need for better covering the marine part of the coastal zone, and in line with the EU boost to Integrated Maritime Policy, the organization changed the name in 2009 to the current Coastal & Marine Union (EUCC). While keeping on working on ICZM for example in the OURCOAST  database for the European Commission, EUCC broadened the scope of its activities. It is highly involved in the EC Marine Strategy Framework Directive (MSFD), particularly on the descriptors marine litter and underwater noise, and was at the forefront of the creation of the European maritime stakeholders’ platform which idea was launched at 2009 European Maritime Day in Rome, headed by Prof. Johan Vande Lanotte, who was then EUCC's president.

Since 2009, EUCC has been involved in an integration process with a number of organizations, working under the name ECNC Group. The purpose of the grouping is to facilitate and better develop the activities of the members by a pooling of resources, outreach or skills. This will produce better results than the members acting alone. The ECNC Group consists of two units: 'Biodiversity and Nature' (ECNC) and 'Coastal and Marine' (EUCC). The members of the ECNC Group are ECNC-European Centre for Nature Conservation, the Coastal & Marine Union (EUCC) and Centro Mediterráneo EUCC. Euronatur, the NatureBureau and EECONET Action Fund are observers of the ECNC Group.

EUCC's presidents

Organizational structure

The Coastal and Marine Union (EUCC) is an association with a membership of around 500 institutions, NGOs and experts in 40 countries, organised in national branches. The organisation is headed by an international Council that is composed of one representative per national branch. A number of Council members are assigned as members of the Executive Committee.

The Executive Committee is responsible for the management of matters of a strategic nature and provides guidance to the international office in Leiden. The international office provides services to the national branches and encourages and leads join initiatives. EUCC counts with a regional office for the Mediterranean Sea, the EUCC Mediterranean Centre in Barcelona, Spain. This office represents a separate legal entity under Spanish law, and it is managed by its own Board. .
There are national branches in the following 13 countries: Belgium, Denmark, France (EUCC-France Le Réseau Européen des Littoraux), Germany (EUCC – The Coastal Union Germany), Italy, Lithuania, Malta, Netherlands, Poland, Portugal, Spain, Ukraine and United Kingdom. Not all branches are active.
Furthermore, EUCC Council established an Advisory Board in 2004 which assists the EUCC Executive Committee, International Offices and National Branches in the development of EUCC policies and projects on the basis of their expertise and experience.

Fields of work

Conferences
EUCC has been organizing bi-annual conferences since 1987 implementing its network's mission namely “bringing together the scientific community, coastal practitioners and policy makers”. Until 1999, the conference was organized uniquely by EUCC under the name “Coastlines”, and later on it joined forces with Eurocoast, an association mainly concerned by the technical aspects of coastal processes, thus giving birth to the “Littoral” conferences in 2002.

EUCC also supports other conferences organized by national branches, like the International Conference on Coastal Conservation and Management (ICCCM), organized by EUCC Portugal.

Publications
Thanks to the efforts of Dr. Frank van der Meulen and Dr. David Green, an official scientific organ of the EUCC was created in 1994. Published by Springer, the Journal of Coastal Conservation became a scientific journal for the dissemination of both theoretical and applied research on integrated and sustainable management of the terrestrial, coastal and marine environmental interface.

Furthermore, EUCC publishes the quarterly magazine “Coastal & Marine”, aimed at those professionally involved in coastal management, planning and conservation in Europe as well as a number of newsletters of different geographical coverage and news blogs.

Capacity building
EUCC mission includes providing knowledge and capacity and foster public outreach. Both the International Secretariat and the offices and branches place efforts to this end.

Inspired by Prof. Roland Paskoff, EUCC-France started to organise a series of expert field workshops throughout the French territory, two each year, promoting dialogue between scientists and coastal managers. After 15 years of workshops, the book Les ateliers d’EUCC-France. De la connaissance des systèmes littoraux à la gestion intégrée des zones côtières was published gathering these experiences.

The international Secretariat and the Mediterranean Centre leads the multidisciplinary international partnership which developed the first on-line, free of use distance training programme on ICZM, CoastLearn, available in 13 languages. This self-learning tool targets primarily coastal managers and planners working at local, sub-national, and national levels and is accessible on-line free of charge. Furthermore, EUCC-Germany counts with a similar tool, IKZM-D Lernen. This was one of the many projects undertaken by EUCC-Germany.
Another example dealing with academic education is the recent Climate of Coastal Cooperation initiative with young professionals, which has followed the publication of the Climate of Coastal Cooperation, co-produced by EUCC. This initiative aims to establish a Young Professionals Coastal Community (YPCC), based on the principle that innovative, resilient, no-regret adaptive options should involve young professionals at an early stage through familiarising them with the concepts and tools of ICZM.

Policy development
EUCC aims to contribute to improving coastal and marine policies leading to sustainable development. Already at its earliest times EUCC contributed significantly to the preparation of the Pan-European Biological and Landscape Diversity Strategy (PEBLDS), adopted in 1995 by the Environment for Europe Ministers Conference and led the elaboration of the European Coastal & Marine Ecological Network (ECMEN)  and the European Code of Conduct for Coastal Zones   adopted by the Council of Europe Ministers in 1999.

The 1st European Coastal Conservation Conference 1991, organised by the EUCC and the Dutch government, marked the start of the development of Integrated Coastal Zone Management (ICZM) as a policy approach in the European Community. It led to the EC Demonstration Programme for ICZM and to the adoption of the European Council and Parliament Recommendation on ICZM (2002). EUCC was invited by the European Commission to join the EU ICZM Expert Group; Dr. Alan Pickaver was EUCC's representative in this expert group until August 2013. As a result, a novel means for Member States to measure the progress they are making on ICZM implementation through the use of indicators was developed. This method was presented to the Working Group on Indicators and data and accepted by the Group of Experts in 2006.

In recent times EUCC has placed efforts on the practical implications of ICZM implementation, developing practical tools as DeCyDe for Sustainability  and the use of ICZM and Maritime Spatial Planning (MSP) as tools for climate change adaptation. It is deeply involved in the implementation of the MSFD being part of the Technical Subgroup Marine Litter (TSG-ML) and acting as Technical Secretariat to the  Technical Subgroups on Marine Litter and Underwater Noise.

In the field of sustainable coastal tourism EUCC has created tools to monitor coastal destination management and set up an award and certification programme “QualityCoast” which enables coastal towns, regions and parks to meet global standards as a sustainable tourism destination. EUCC's QualityCoast Team is doing research into social issues related to sustainable tourism and also responsible for the Global Sustainable Tourism Review.

Field projects

EUCC has a long record of field projects implementation related to nature conservation, especially in delta, wetlands and dune areas of the Baltic, Black sea and Mediterranean coast. Most projects deal with wetland restoration in former intensive agriculture grounds. In this regard, one of the most remarkable milestones has been the protection of ca. 4000 ha of coastal meadows, wetlands, forest and lagoon waters at the eastern, Polish part of the Szczecin Lagoon (Oder Delta). Coastal & Marine Union (EUCC) and EUCC Poland have joined efforts along the years to establish the first privately managed Nature Park in Poland, the Odra Delta Nature Park. EUCC Poland is the owner of ca. 1000 ha while the rest belongs to the Forestry and Maritime offices and some small private owners. The area belongs now to the Natura 2000 network. Stakeholders’ engagement, hydrological restoration, reintroduction of extensive grazing, eco-tourism development and educational programmes have resulted on a good practice example of international recognition. A development strategy for the community was drawn up  to embrace the opportunities which the Nature values of the area afforded. This has led to the area developing a niche market for eco-tourism with new occupations alongside more traditional ones.

In Morocco, following an ICZM plan project (CAP Nador) in the province of Nador, a complementary project (ABIPA C3F) allowed restoring 18,6 ha from erosion by planting fruit trees, in Cap des Trois Fourches.

In the North Sea, EUCC has contributed to the recovery of stable subtidal and intertidal mussel beds in the Dutch Wadden Sea through the Mosselwad project. Another important initiative is “Protect a wreck”, aimed at protecting and cleaning these notable biodiversity sites. Linked to this, the HealthySeas initiative consists on recycling abandoned fishing nets in the sea to recycle them into nylon fabric.

Finally, in the Black Sea, a project in Bulgaria and Romania allowed listing priority regions marine protected areas (MPAs) designation and the development of ecologically coherent network of MPAs in these countries.

Information exchange
One of the core fields of EUCC has been facilitating information exchange, with the ultimate goal of bridging the gap between scientists and policy makers. Regarding ICZM, EUCC played an important role in building up the OURCOAST database for the European Commission, ensuring that lessons learned from the coastal management experiences and practices are shared and made accessible.

In this context EUCC has been one of the initiators of the ENCORA European network of coastal management networks and its main achievement, the Coastal Wiki, an internet based encyclopaedia, adapting the model of Wikipedia. The Wikipedia concept complements present knowledge dissemination practices and mitigates major shortcomings: scientific publications only accessible to experts, lack of interdisciplinary links, difficult access to practical knowledge and experience due to dispersal over grey literature sources, lack of comprehensiveness and consistency among sources, not freely accessible literature and sources which are not up to date, and delays in establishing intellectual property rights through traditional publishing routes.

References

External links
 EUCC website

Marine conservation organizations